The Dobârca is a left tributary of the river Secaș in Romania. It flows into the Secaș in Miercurea Sibiului.

References

Rivers of Romania
Rivers of Sibiu County